The Book of Joy: Lasting Happiness in a Changing World is a book by the Nobel Peace Prize Laureates Tenzin Gyatso, the 14th Dalai Lama, and Archbishop Desmond Tutu published in 2016 by Cornerstone Publishers. In this nonfiction, the authors discuss the challenges of living a joyful life.
One commentator noted that both of the authors faced oppression and exile and yet have been able to maintain their compassion and forgiveness despite this. The commentator also noted the theme of the book is that fear, anger, and hatred exist internally as much as externally.

In 2021, Netflix release the film Mission: Joy - Finding Happiness in Troubled Times, based on the book. (IMDB)

In 2022, an illustrated book aimed at children "The Little Book of Joy" is published.

References 

2016 non-fiction books
Books by the 14th Dalai Lama
Desmond Tutu
Collaborative non-fiction books